The ukulele is a small stringed instrument with four strings.

Ukulele may also refer to:
 Cliff Edwards, known as "Ukulele Ike", an American singer
 "Ukulele Lady", a song by Gus Kahn and Richard A. Whiting
 Ukulele Baby!, an album by The Wiggles
 Several orchestras:
 Langley Ukulele Ensemble
 New York Ukulele Ensemble
 Ukulele Orchestra of Great Britain
 Wellington International Ukulele Orchestra
 Ukulele (Taiwanese band), a Taiwanese pop duet
 Yooka-Laylee, a 2017 3D platform game